Don DaGradi (March 1, 1911 – August 4, 1991) was an American writer for Disney who started out as a layout artist on 1940s cartoons including "Der Fuehrer's Face" in 1943. He eventually moved into animated features with the film Lady and the Tramp in 1955. He also worked as a color and styling or sequence consultant on many other motion pictures for Disney. His greatest achievement was for his visual screenplay for Mary Poppins in 1964 for which he shared an Oscar nomination for Best Adapted Screenplay with Bill Walsh. Don DaGradi died August 4, 1991, in Friday Harbor, Washington.  He was named a Disney Legend posthumously, only months after his death. DaGradi lived in Friday Harbor, WA with his wife Betty and two children.

In the 2013 film Saving Mr. Banks, DaGradi is portrayed by actor Bradley Whitford.

Filmography
Dumbo (1941) - production designer
The Olympic Champ (1942) (short) - layout artist
How to Fish (1942) (short) - layout artist
Der Fuehrer's Face (1942) (short) - layout artist
Victory Vehicles (1943) (short) - layout artist
Victory Through Air Power (1943) (documentary) - art direction
How to Be a Sailor (1944) (short) - layout artist
The Three Caballeros (1944)  - layout artist
Duck Pimples (1945) (short) - layout artist
Hockey Homicide (1945) (short) - layout artist
Make Mine Music (1946)  - layout artist
Fun & Fancy Free (1947)  - layout artist
The Legend of Johnny Appleseed (1948) (short) - layout artist
The Adventures of Ichabod and Mr. Toad (1949) - color and styling
Cinderella (1950) - color and styling
The Brave Engineer (1950) (short) - layout artist
Alice in Wonderland (1951) - color and styling
Susie the Little Blue Coupe (1952) (short) - story
Peter Pan (1953) - color and styling
A Story of Dogs (1954) - special art work
Lady and the Tramp (1955) - story
Adventures in Fantasy (1957) (TV) - layout artist
Four Fabulous Characters (1957) (TV) - layout artist
Sleeping Beauty (1959) - writer
Darby O'Gill and the Little People (1959) - special art styling
Pollyanna (1960) - sequence consultant
Kidnapped (1960) - story sketches
The Parent Trap (1961) - sequence consultant
The Absent Minded Professor (1961) - sequence consultant
Son of Flubber (1963) - writer
Mary Poppins (1964) - writer
Lt. Robin Crusoe, U.S.N. (1966) - writer
Blackbeard's Ghost (1968) - writer
The Love Bug (1968) - writer
Scandalous John (1971) - writer
Bedknobs and Broomsticks (1971) - writer

References

External links
Disney Legends

1911 births
1991 deaths
American male screenwriters
American film producers
Animation screenwriters
Walt Disney Animation Studios people
Film directors from California
People from San Juan County, Washington
Film directors from Washington (state)
Screenwriters from California
20th-century American male writers
20th-century American writers
20th-century American screenwriters